The men's 200 metre backstroke was an event on the Swimming at the 1900 Summer Olympics schedule in Paris. It was the first Olympic swimming event to not be a freestyle competition. It was held on 11 August and 12 August 1900. 16 swimmers from 7 nations competed. The event was won by Ernst Hoppenberg of Germany, with Karl Ruberl of Austria second and Johannes Drost of the Netherlands third.

Background

This was the first appearance of the 200 metre backstroke event. The event did not return until 1964; since then, it has been on the programme at every Summer Games. From 1904 to 1960, a men's 100 metre backstroke was held instead. In 1964, only the 200 metres was held. Beginning in 1968 and ever since, both the 100 and 200 metre versions have been held.

Before the Games, Great Britain's Robert Crawshaw was described in The New York Herald Tribune as the "champion breast and back swimmer of the world".

Competition format

The competition used a two-round format, with semifinals and a final. The entrants were divided into three semifinals; each semifinal had approximately 12 swimmers entered, though withdrawals left each with between 3 and 7 swimmers. The fastest swimmer in each semifinal advanced to the final along with the next seven fastest times overall. This resulted in a 10-swimmer final.

The races were swum downstream in the Seine.

Records

There were no recognized records in the 200 metre backstroke before this competition: world records would not be recognized until 1909.

Ernst Hoppenberg had the best time in the first semifinal at 2:54.4, setting the initial Olympic record. He beat his own time in the final, at 2:47.0, for a record that stood for 64 years, until the next time the event was held (when Bob Bennett broke it by over 30 seconds, with a 2:16.1 in the first heat).

Schedule

Results

Semifinals

In the first round, there were three semifinals. The winner of each semifinal advanced to the final, as did the seven fastest losers from across all the semifinals. The semifinals were held on 11 August.

Semifinal 1

Semifinal 2

Semifinal 3

Final

The final was held on 12 August.

Results summary

Notes

Swimming at the 1900 Summer Olympics
200 metre backstroke at the Olympics